Like a Woman is the debut studio album by American singer Kacy Hill. It was released on June 30, 2017 by G.O.O.D. Music and Def Jam Recordings.

Track listing

Notes
  signifies a co-producer
  signifies an additional producer

Sample credits
 “Am I” contains elements of “Closing” by Philip Glass

Personnel
Credits adapted from AllMusic.
 Matthew Burns – composer
 Oskar Sikow – composer
 Philip Glass – composer
 Samuel Griesemer – composer
 Robin Hannibal – composer
 Jamie Hartman – composer
 Dan Heath – composer
 Kacy Hill – composer, primary artist
 Terrace Martin – composer
 Dijon McFarlane – composer
 Shirley Murdock – composer
 Matt Parad – composer
 William Phillips – composer
 Jerome Potter – composer
 Autumn Rowe – composer
 Larry Troutman – composer
 Roger Troutman – composer
 Andrew Wyatt – composer

References

2017 debut albums
Albums produced by Terrace Martin
Albums produced by DJ Mustard
Albums produced by Stuart Price
GOOD Music albums
Def Jam Recordings albums